Mac Studio is a small-form-factor workstation designed, manufactured, and sold by Apple Inc. It is one of four desktop computers in the Mac lineup, sitting above the consumer-range Mac Mini and iMac, and positioned below the Mac Pro. It is configurable with either the M1 Max or M1 Ultra system on a chip.

Overview
The Mac Studio was announced on March 8, 2022, alongside the Apple Studio Display, and released on March 18. At the time of launch, customers reported shipping delays for the Mac Studio as late as May 2022. The delay has been attributed to the global chip shortage.

The Mac Studio is designed as a higher-grade machine than the Mac Mini but lower than the Mac Pro, and is positioned similarly to the now-discontinued iMac Pro. There are two models which are driven by ARM-based SoC: the M1 Max or the M1 Ultra, which combines two M1 Max chips in one package. It has four Thunderbolt 4 (USB 4) ports, two USB 3.0 Type-A ports, HDMI (up to 4K @ 60 Hz), 10Gb Ethernet with Lights Out Management and a headphone jack. The front panel has two USB-C ports (Thunderbolt 4 in M1 Ultra models) and an SD card slot (that supports SDXC cards and UHS-II bus), making it the first desktop Mac since the 2012 Mac Pro to have I/O on the front. It is cooled by a pair of double-sided blowers and a mesh of holes on the bottom and back of the case, which helps reduce the noise of fans spinning. Nevertheless, there have been extensive early reports of excessive fan noise.

Mac Studio models with the M1 Ultra are  heavier than those with the M1 Max as they are equipped with a larger copper heat sink. Apple says the Mac Studio performs 50 percent faster than a Mac Pro with a 16-core Intel Xeon processor.

The Mac Studio supports up to four 6K monitors connected via Thunderbolt, and a fifth monitor via HDMI. It was introduced alongside the Apple Studio Display, a 27-inch 5K monitor with an integrated 12 megapixel camera, six-speaker sound system with spatial audio and Dolby Atmos support and a height adjustable stand.

Repairability 

Mac Studio has two removable flash storage ports, with one or two of them in use, the latter in models with 4 or 8 TB of storage. While it is possible to swap the flash storage card between same size models, with an Apple Configurator restore, upgrading is not supported yet. Some reviewers have criticized this decision as unfriendly for right to repair, while Ars Technica notes this limitation may be due to the design of Apple silicon that implements the SSD controller into the system on a chip rather than the drive itself for encryption purposes. The positioning of components such as the SSD beneath an exposed power supply has also been criticized.

Specifications

References

External links 

Computer-related introductions in 2022
ARM Macintosh computers
Macintosh desktops